The Norwegian Tunneling Society or NFF is a professional association established in 1963 which represents the rock blasting and tunneling industry in Norway.

References

External links
 
 English-language site

Employers' organisations in Norway
Organisations based in Bærum
1963 establishments in Norway
Tunnelling organizations
Tunnels in Norway